Ian Alan Nicolson (born 9 October 1986) is a Zimbabwean cricketer who took part in the 2006 U-19 Cricket World Cup. He currently plays first-class, List A and Twenty20 cricket for the Mid West Rhinos cricket team in Zimbabwe.

Nicolson has represented Zimbabwe in ODI cricket.

He along with Shingirai Masakadza holds the record for the highest last-wicket stand in ODIs for Zimbabwe(60)

References

1986 births
Zimbabwean cricketers
Zimbabwe One Day International cricketers
Living people
Midlands cricketers
North West cricketers
Easterns cricketers
Cricketers from Harare
White Zimbabwean sportspeople